The 2009 M-1 Challenge season was the second season of the M-1 Challenge series presented by M-1 Global.  It started on February 21, 2009 and concluded on December 3, 2009.  16 teams from around the world competed in the 2009 M-1 Challenge Season, up from the 9 teams that competed in 2008. The teams typically featured top MMA prospects. The Season was won by the Russian Legion team.

Background
M-1 Challenge is a team-based competition organized with a series of events held in different places around the world where MMA clubs compete against each other. The teams consist of five fighters, one in each of the five major MMA weight classes-  Lightweight, Welterweight, Middleweight, Light Heavyweight and Heavyweight.

Team Results

Group Stage Standings

x-clinched group title and semifinal playoff berth

Semi-finals 

 USA East defeats  USA West (4-1)

 Russian Legion defeats  United Kingdom (4-1)

Finals 

 Russian Legion defeats  USA East to claim the second M-1 Challenge (5-0)

Season Results
21 February 2009 (Seattle, USA)  Sang Soo Lee

 Finland vs.  Benelux (4-1)

 Lightweight bout:  Danny van Bergen defeats  Juha-Pekka Vainikainen via unanimous decision.
 Welterweight bout:  Janne Tulirinta defeats  Tommy Depret via submission (D'arce choke) at 2:30 of Round 1.
 Middleweight bout:  Lucio Linhares defeats  Kamil Uygun via submission (armbar) at 1:22 of Round 1.
 Light Heavyweight bout:  Marcus Vänttinen defeats  Jason Jones by unanimous decision.
 Heavyweight bout:  Toni Valtonen defeats  Sander Duyvis via TKO (punches) at 0:18 of Round 1.

 South Korea vs.  The Imperial Team (3-2)

 Lightweight bout:  Do Hyung Kim defeats  Mikhail Malyutin via unanimous decision.
 Welterweight  bout:  Myung Ho Bae defeats  Erik Oganov via submission (rear naked choke) at 2:12 of Round 2.
 Middleweight bout:  Dmitri Samoylov defeats  Hyun Gyu Lim via unanimous decision.
 Light Heavyweight bout:  Jae Young Kim defeats  Mikhail Zayats via TKO (head kick) at 4:02 of Round 2.
 Heavyweight bout:  Alexey Oleinik defeats  Sang Soo Lee via submission (ezekiel choke) at 4:27 of Round 2.

 USA West vs.  Brazil (3-2)

 Lightweight bout:  Dave Jansen defeats  Flavio Roberto Alvaro via unanimous decision.
 Welterweight bout:  Eduardo Pamplona defeats  Dylan Clay via TKO (punches) at 2:48 of Round 3.
 Middleweight bout:  Reggie Orr defeats  Juliano Cioffi Belgine via split decision.
 Light Heavyweight bout:  Raphael Davis defeats  Jair Goncalves Junior via TKO (punches) at 4:05 of Round 1.
 Heavyweight bout:  Jose Edson dos Santos Franca defeats  Carl Seumanutafa via split decision.

28 March 2009 (Bourgas, Bulgaria) 

USA East vs. Bulgaria (5-0)

 Lightweight bout:   Renato Migliaccio defeats Yanko Yanev via submission (armbar) at 4:45 of Round 1.
 Welterweight bout:  Steve Carl  defeats  Ivan Ivanov via submission (rear naked choke) at 3:31 of Round 1.
 Middleweight bout:   Herbert Goodman defeats Jordan Radev via knockout at 4:59 of Round 2.
 Light Heavyweight bout:  Chuck Grigsby defeats  Atanas Dzhambazov via unanimous decision.
 Heavyweight bout:  Lloyd Marshbanks defeats  Emil Samoilov via submission (heel hook) at 3:27 of Round 1.

 Germany vs. Turkey (5-0)

 Lightweight bout:  Franco de Leonardis defeats  Akin Duran via submission (triangle choke) at 2:29 of Round 1.
 Welterweight bout:  Daniel Weichel defeats  Fatih Dogan via submission (d'arce choke) at 2:29 of Round 1.
 Middleweight bout:  Gregor Herb defeats  Ahmed Bayrak via submission (rear naked choke) at 2:00 of Round 2.
 Light Heavyweight bout:  Martin Zawada defeats  Samy Turky via TKO at 2:38 of Round 1.
 Heavyweight bout:  David Baziak defeats  Tugrul Okay via TKO at 0:52 of Round 2.

 Legion Sport Club vs. World Team (4-1)

 Lightweight bout:  Yuri Ivlev defeats  Romano de los Reyes via unanimous decision.
 Welterweight bout:  Magomed Shikhshabekov defeats  Jason Ponet via submission (triangle choke) at 1:34 of Round 1.
 Middleweight bout:  Sergey Kornev defeats  Nathan Schouteren via KO at 0:12 of Round 1.
 Light Heavyweight bout:  Gadzhimurad Omarov defeats  Nils van Noord via submission (rear naked choke) at 2:24 of Round 1.
 Heavyweight bout:  Michal Kita defeats  Ahmed Sultanov via KO at 2:30 of Round 1.

29 April 2009 (Tokyo, Japan) 

 England vs.  Japan (4-1)

 Lightweight bout:  Luiz Andrade defeats  Ian Butlin via submission (armbar) at 3:20 of Round 1.
 Welterweight bout:  Simon Phillips defeats  Hidehiko Hasegawa via KO at 0:20 of Round 1.
 Middleweight bout:  Matt Thorpe defeats  Yusuke Masuda via submission (rear naked choke) at 1:30 of Round 2.
 Lightheavyweight bout:  Tom Blackledge defeats  Tatsuya Mizuno via submission (rear naked choke) at 3:22 of Round 1.
 Heavyweight bout:  Rob Broughton defeats  Yusuke Kawaguchi via unanimous decision.

 Spain vs.  France (3-2)

 Lightweight bout:  Jose Luis Zapater defeats  Makhtar Gueye via disqualification (illegal kick) at 1:21 of Round 3.
 Welterweight bout:  Abner Lloveras defeats  Gael Grimaud via split decision.
 Middleweight bout:  Christophe Dafreville defeats  Rayco Silva via submission (Anaconda choke) at 2:48 of Round 1.
 Lightheavyweight bout:  Christian M'Pumbu defeats  Enoc Solves via submission (armbar) at 4:59 of Round 1.
 Heavyweight bout:  Rogent Lloret defeats  Soufian Elgarne via submission (anaconda choke) at 2:44 of Round 1.

 USA West vs.  South Korea (5-0)

 Lightweight bout:  Dave Jansen defeats  Yui Chul Nam via unanimous decision.
 Welterweight bout:  Fábio Nascimento defeats  Myung Ho Bae via majority decision.
 Middleweight bout:  Givanildo Santana defeats  Min Suk Heo via submission (armbar) at 4:05 of Round 1.
 Lightheavyweight bout:  Raphael Davis defeats  Jae Young Kim via TKO (punches) at 3:45 of Round 2.
 Heavyweight bout:  Shane Del Rosario defeats  Dool Hee Lee via KO (head kick) at 2:27 of Round 1.

9 May 2009 (São Paulo, Brazil) 

 Bulgaria vs.  Benelux (3-2)

 Lightweight bout:   Yanko Yanev defeats  Danny van Bergen via submission (armbar) at 2:23 of Round 1.
 Welterweight bout:  Raymond Jarman defeats  Ivan Ivanov via TKO (flying knee) at 0:35 of Round 1.
 Middleweight bout:  Jordan Radev defeats   Danny Smit via unanimous decision.
 Lightheavyweight bout:  Emil Samoilov defeats  Jason Jones via TKO (doctor’s stoppage) at 2:09 of Round 1.
 Heavyweight bout:  Jessie Gibbs defeats  Nikola Dipchkov via submission (strikes) at 1:37 of Round 1.

 Legion Sport Club vs.  Germany (4-1)

 Lightweight bout:   Yura Ivlev defeats  Franco de Leonardis via TKO (strikes) at 2:14 of Round 2.
 Welterweight bout:  Magomed Shikhshabekov defeats  Sven Heising via knockout (strikes) at 4:27 of Round 1.
 Middleweight bout:   Gregor Herb defeats  Sergey Kornev via submission (armbar) at 4:32 of Round 1.
 Lightheavyweight bout:  Gadzimurad Omarov defeats  Ismail Centinkaya via submission (strikes) at 1:09 of Round 1.
 Heavyweight bout:  Akhmed Sultanov defeats  Lars Klug via submission (armbar) at 1:21 of Round 1.

 Brazil vs.  The Imperial Team (5-0)

 Lightweight bout:  Hacran Dias defeats  Amirkhan Mazikhov via submission (rear naked choke) at 3:58 of Round 1.
 Welterweight bout:  Eduardo Pamplona defeats  Erik Oganov via majority decision.
 Middleweight bout:  Leandro Silva defeats   Dmitri Samoylov via unanimous decision.
 Lightheavyweight bout:  Alexander Machado defeats   Mikhail Zayats via unanimous decision.
 Heavyweight bout:  Joaquim Ferreira defeats  Maxim Grishin via submission (North/South Choke) at 3:57 of Round 1.

5 June 2009 (Kansas City, USA) 

 World Team vs.  Turkey (4-1)

 Lightweight bout:  Akin Duran defeats  Romano De Los Reyes via TKO (strikes) at 1:57 of Round 3.
 Welterweight bout:  Diego Gonzalez defeats  Fatih Dogan via TKO (strikes) at 2:16 of Round 1.
 Middleweight bout:  Nathan Schouteren defeats  Ahmed Bayrak via TKO (strikes) at 3:21 of Round 1.
 Light Heavyweight bout:  Ryan Sturdy defeats  John Doyle via majority decision.
 Heavyweight bout:  Michał Kita defeats  Liron Wilson via TKO (strikes) at 3:27 of Round 1.

 France vs.  England (4-1)

 Lightweight bout:  Makhtar Gueye defeats  Ian Butlin via TKO (strikes) at 0:09 of Round 1.
 Welterweight bout:   Gael Grimaud defeats  Simon Phillips via submission (triangle) 1:29 of Round 1.
 Middleweight bout:  Christophe Dafreville defeats  Matt Thorpe via submission (triangle) at 4:32 of Round 1.
 Light Heavyweight bout:  Johan Romming defeats  Danny Giblin via submission (North/South choke) at 1:59 of Round 1.
 Heavyweight bout:  Rob Broughton defeats  Soufian Elgarne via corner stoppage (injury) at 2:02 of Round 1.

 USA East vs.  Finland (3-2)

 Lightweight bout:  Renato Migliaccio defeats  Niko Puhakka via submission (armbar) at 4:18 of Round 1.
 Welterweight bout:   Janne Tulirinta defeats  Anthony Ford via TKO (strikes) at 0:11 of Round 1.
 Middleweight bout:  Lucio Linhares defeats  Valdir Araujo via knockout at 1:25 of Round 1.
 Light Heavyweight bout:  Rodney Wallace defeats  Marcus Vänttinen via unanimous decision.
 Heavyweight bout:  Lloyd Marshbanks defeats  Toni Valtonen via submission (neck crank/side headlock) at 0:55 of Round 2.

4 July 2009 (Seoul, South Korea) 

 Finland vs.  Bulgaria (4-1)

 Lightweight bout:  Niko Puhakka defeats  Yanko Yanev via TKO (strikes) at 2:16 of Round 1.
 Welterweight bout:  Janne Tulirinta defeats  Ivan Ivanov via TKO (strikes) at 3:44 of Round 1.
 Middleweight bout:  Rosen Dimitrov defeats  Mikko Suvanto via majority decision.
 Light Heavyweight bout:  Marcus Vänttinen defeats  Emil Samoilov via submission (verbal) at 3:42 of Round 3.
 Heavyweight bout:  Toni Valtonen defeats  Nikola Dipchkov via submission (triangle) at 4:49 of Round 1.

 USA West vs.  The Imperial Team (5-0)

 Lightweight bout:  Dave Jansen defeats  Amirkhan Mazikhov via submission (guillotine) at 0:22 of Round 1.
 Welterweight bout:  Fábio Nascimento defeats  Marat Ilaev via submission (armbar) at 2:13 of Round 2.
 Middleweight bout:  Givanildo Santana defeats  Radmir Gabdulin via submission (arm triangle) at 3:47 of Round 1.
 Light Heavyweight bout:  Tony Lopez defeats  Viktor Nemkov via submission (rear naked choke) at 3:06 of Round 2.
 Heavyweight bout:  Shane Del Rosario defeats  Maksim Grishin via TKO (strikes) at 0:21 of Round 1.

 Brazil vs.  South Korea (3-2)

 Lightweight bout:  Nam Yui Chul defeats  Hacran Dias via unanimous decision.
 Welterweight bout:  Eduardo Pamplona defeats  Do Hyung Kim via unanimous decision.
 Middleweight bout: Daniel Acacio defeats  Jae Young Kim via majority decision.
 Light Heavyweight bout:  Alexander Machado defeats  Dool Hee Lee via submission (rear naked choke) at 3:26 of Round 2.
 Heavyweight bout:  Hae Joon Yang defeats  Joaquim Ferreira def. via knockout at 0:14 of Round 1.

15 August 2009 (Amsterdam, the Netherlands) 

 England vs.  Spain (5-0)

 Lightweight bout:  Scott Hewitt defeats  Jose Roque via submission (armbar) at 1:35 of Round 2.
 Welterweight bout:  Simon Phillips defeats  Jonathan Leon via submission (rear naked choke) at 4:29 of Round 1.
 Middleweight bout:  Matt Thorpe defeats  Rafael Rodriguez via submission (triangle) at 0:56 of Round 1.
 Light Heavyweight bout:  Tom Blackledge defeats  Enoc Solves via KO (head kick) at 0:09 of Round 1.
 Heavyweight bout:  David Keeley defeats  Paco Estevez via TKO (strikes) at 4:23 of Round 2.

 Japan vs.  France (3-2)

 Lightweight bout:  Yoshiro Tomioka defeats  Frederic Fernandez via submission (triangle) at 3:53 Round 1.
 Welterweight bout:  Yuya Shirai defeats  Gael Grimaud via TKO (strikes) at 4:16 of Round 1.
 Middleweight bout:  Christophe Dafreville defeats  Yusuke Masuda via submission (armbar) at 2:27 of Round 1.
 Light Heavyweight bout:  Christian M'Pumbu defeats  Hideto Tatsumi via TKO (strikes) at 4:53 of Round 2.
 Heavyweight bout:  Yoshiyuki Nakanishi defeats  Akim Assenine via submission (Achilles lock) at 4:51 of Round 1.

 Germany vs. World Team (4-1)

 Lightweight bout:  Daniel Weichel defeats  Danial Sharifi via submission (guillotine) at 2:53 of Round 2.
 Welterweight bout:  Diego Gonzalez* defeats  Nordin Asrih via unanimous decision.
 Middleweight bout:  Nathan Schouteren defeats  Ismael Cetinkaya via TKO (strikes) at 3:51 of Round 1.
 Light Heavyweight bout:  Mathias Schuck defeats  Johan Romming via unanimous decision.
 Heavyweight bout:  Thorsten Kronz defeats  Miodrag Petkovic via TKO (doctor’s stoppage) at 3:08 of Round 2.
 Despite winning the individual bout, Gonzales’ victory over Asrih was not valid as Gonzales failed to make weight within the M-1 Challenge designated time limit. Per M-1 Challenge rules, the fight was ruled a forfeit in Germany’s favor as it relates to the M-1 Challenge standings.

16 August 2009 (Amsterdam, the Netherlands) 

 Japan vs.  Spain (4-1)

 Lightweight bout:  Abner Lloveras defeats  Luiz Andrade via unanimous decision.
 Welterweight bout:  Hidehiko Hasegawa defeats  Jose Bertran via unanimous decision.
 Middleweight bout:  Rikuhei Fujii defeats  Rayco Kakin via unanimous decision.
 Light Heavyweight bout:  Tatsuya Mizuno defeats  Rafael Rodriguez via submission (rear naked choke) at 2:20 of Round 1.
 Heavyweight bout:  Yusuke Kawaguchi defeats  Cirio Tejera via unanimous decision.

 Legion Sport Club vs.  Turkey (5-0)

 Lightweight bout:  Rustam Khabilov defeats  Akin Duran via knockout (slam) at 0:28 of Round 1.
 Welterweight bout:  Magomed Shikhshabekov defeats  Fatih Dogan via TKO (strikes) at 0:35 of Round 1.
 Middleweight bout:  Sergey Kornev defeats  Ahmed Bayrak via submission (neck crank) at 1:04 of Round 2.
 Light Heavyweight bout:  Besiki Gerenava defeats  Abdullah Ahmady via submission (rear naked choke) at 3:51 of Round 2.
 Heavyweight bout:  Akhmed Sultanov defeats  Gurhan Degirmenci via submission (triangle) at 1:07 of Round 1.

 Benelux vs.  USA East (3-2)

 Lightweight bout:  Danny van Bergen defeats  David Zitnik via TKO (strikes) at 2:07 of Round 1.
 Welterweight bout:  Shamar Bailey defeats  Raymond Jarman via TKO (strikes) at 3:15 of Round 2.
 Middleweight bout:  John Doyle defeats  Richard Plug via unanimous decision.
 Light Heavyweight bout:  Jason Jones defeats  Mike Connors via submission (strikes) at 1:00 of Round 1.
 Heavyweight bout:  Jessie Gibbs defeats  Charles Grigsby via unanimous decision.

Final round
Semi-Finals

26 September 2009 (Rostov-on-Don, Russia)

 USA East vs.  USA West (4-1)

 Lightweight bout:  Ivan Jorge defeats  Steve Magdaleno via unanimous decision.
 Welterweight bout:  Delson Heleno defeats  Fabio Nascimento via unanimous decision.
 Middleweight bout:  Gerson Dos Santos defeats  Joao Asis via TKO (strikes) at 3:50 of Round 1.
 Light Heavyweight bout:  Chuck Grigsby defeats   Spencer Hooker via unanimous decision.
 Heavyweight bout:  Shane Del Rosario defeats  Lloyd Marshbanks via TKO at 1:34 of Round 1.

 Russian Legion vs.  England(4-1)

 Lightweight bout:  Yuri Ivlev defeats  Scott Hewitt via TKO (strikes) at 0:54 of Round 1.
 Welterweight bout:  Magomed Shikhshabekov defeats  Simon Phillips via submission (reverse heel hook) at 0:15 of Round 1.
 Middleweight bout:  Ansar Chalangov defeats  Matt Thorpe via submission (reverse heel hook) at 0:41 of Round 1.
 Light Heavyweight bout:  Besiki Gerenava defeats  Lee Austin via unanimous decision.
 Heavyweight bout:  Rob Broughton defeats  Akhmed Sultanov via submission (keylock) at 4:31 of Round 1.Finals3 December 2009 (St. Petersburg, Russia) Russian Legion vs.  USA East'' (5-0)

 Lightweight bout:  Yura Ivlev defeats  Ivan Jorge via TKO (strikes) at 4:11 of Round 2.
 Welterweight bout:  Magomed Shikhshabekov defeats  Gerson Dos Santos via submission (armbar) at 2:06 of Round 1.
 Middleweight bout:  Ansar Chalangov defeats  Danilo Pereira via submission (heel hook) at 4:17 of Round 1.
 Light Heavyweight bout:  Besiki Gerenava defeats  Chuck Grigsby via split decision.
 Heavyweight bout:  Gadzhimurad Omarov defeats  Lloyd Marshbanks via corner stoppage at 4:07 of Round 3.

References

External links
 www.m-1global.com (English)

2009 in mixed martial arts
2009